The Steenbergse Vliet is a small river in North Brabant, the Netherlands. It rises near Steenbergen and flows into the Volkerak, which is part of the Rhine–Meuse–Scheldt delta.

Rivers of North Brabant
Rivers of the Netherlands
Steenbergen
0Steenbergsevliet